Kətəlparaq (also, Ketalparag and Ketal-Porakh) is a village and municipality in the Barda Rayon of Azerbaijan.  It has a population of 3,058.

References 

Populated places in Barda District